The Perry Creek Shelter is in North Cascades National Park, in the U.S. state of Washington. Constructed by United States Forest Service employee Fred Berry in 1937, the shelter was inherited by the National Park Service when North Cascades National Park was dedicated in 1968. The shelter was placed on the National Register of Historic Places in 1989.

Perry Creek Shelter is a wood-framed structure, sheathed in wood shake siding on three sides, and open to the front which faces south. The front roofline extends above the ridgeline, somewhat overhanging the back shed roof.

References

Park buildings and structures on the National Register of Historic Places in Washington (state)
Buildings and structures completed in 1937
Buildings and structures in Whatcom County, Washington
National Register of Historic Places in North Cascades National Park
National Register of Historic Places in Whatcom County, Washington